Hubert Thomann (born 10 April 1962) is a retired Swiss football defender.

References

1962 births
Living people
Swiss men's footballers
FC Bulle players
Association football defenders
Swiss Super League players